Callidiopis scutellaris, the round-headed wood borer, is a native Australian beetle now also present in New Zealand.

References

Beetles of New Zealand
Cerambycinae